The following list is a discography of production by Dame Grease, an American hip hop record producer from Harlem, New York. It includes a list of songs produced, co-produced and remixed by year, artist, album and title.

1997

Mase - Harlem World
"Niggaz Wanna Act"

1998

The LOX - Money, Power & Respect
"If You Think I'm Jiggy"
"Let's Start Rap Over"
"Not to Be Fucked With"
"We'll Always Love Big Poppa"

DMX - It's Dark and Hell Is Hot
"Fuckin' Wit' D"
"Look Thru My Eyes"
"Get At Me Dog"
"Let Me Fly"
"Damien"
"Stop Being Greedy"
"ATF"
"For My Dogs"
"I Can Feel It"
"The Convo"
"Niggas Done Started Somethin'"

Fat Joe - Don Cartagena
"Triplets"

Various artists - Def Jam's Rush Hour Soundtrack
"And You Don't Stop" (performed by Wu-Tang Clan)

DMX - Flesh of My Flesh, Blood of My Blood
"Dogs for Life"

Noreaga - N.O.R.E.
"Body in the Trunk" (featuring Nas)

1999

Harlem World - The Movement
"Meaning of Family"
"Pointing Fingers"

Nas - I Am...
"Ghetto Prisoners"

Tricky - Juxtapose
"For Real"
"Bom Bom Diggy"
"I Like the Girls"
"Hot Like a Sauna"

Nas - Nastradamus
"Some of Us Have Angels"
"Family" (featuring Mobb Deep)
"God Loves Us"
"Quiet Niggas"

DMX - ...And Then There Was X
"Fame"
"D-X-L (Hard White)"

2000

The Madd Rapper - Tell 'Em Why U Madd
"Roll With the Cat"

Various artists - WWF Aggression
"Ministry" (Dame Grease presents Meeno)

Cam'ron - S.D.E.
"My Hood" (featuring Jim Jones)

Capone-N-Noreaga - The Reunion
"You Can't Kill Me"

2001

Eve - Scorpion
"You Ain't Gettin' None"

Mary J. Blige - No More Drama
"Dance for Me"

DMX - The Great Depression
"School Street"
"Trina Moe"
"Shorty Was da Bomb"
"When I'm Nothing"

2003

Kelis - Tasty
"Stick Up"
Leftover
"Everyday Story"

DJ Kay Slay - The Streetsweeper, Vol. 1
"The Champions" (featuring Brucie B, DJ Clue, DJ S&S, Doo Wop, Funkmaster Flex, Kid Capri, Ron & Tony Touch)
"Coast to Coast Gangstas" (featuring Bun B, Joe Budden, Killer Mike, Sauce Money, WC and Hak Ditty)

Das EFX - How We Do
"Greezy"

DMX - Grand Champ
"We 'Bout to Blow"

Yukmouth - Godzilla
"Nothin' 2 A Boss" 
"Stuntastic" 
"Do It B.I."

2004

LL Cool J - The DEFinition
"1 in the Mornin'"

2005

Funkmaster Flex - Car Show Tour
"It's Nothing" (featuring Cam'ron & Juelz Santana)

2006

J.R. Writer - History in the Making
"Zoolander"

DMX - Year of the Dog... Again
"Intro"
"Walk These Dogs"
"Life Be My Song"
"Who Dat" (International bonus track)

Various artists - Smack, the Album Vol. 1
"Gonna Get Mine" (performed by DMX)

Styles P - Time Is Money
"Leave a Message"

2007

Freeway - Free at Last
"Roc-A-Fella Billionaires" (featuring Jay-Z)

DJ Drama - Gangsta Grillz: The Album
"Takin' Pictures" (featuring Young Jeezy, Willie the Kid, JIm Jones, Rick Ross, Young Buck & T.I.)

N.O.R.E. - Noreality
"Sour Diesel" (featuring Styles P)

Hell Rell - For the Hell of It
"Streets Gonna Luv Me"

T.I.
"Crown Me" (featuring Cam'ron & Juelz Santana)

Styles P - Super Gangster (Extraordinary Gentleman)
"Shoot Niggas" (featuring Raw Buck)
"U Ain't Ready 4 Me" (featuring Beanie Sigel)

2008

Sheek Louch - Silverback Gorilla
"What What"

Max B - Bloomberg Series: No Beefin'''===
"Smoke With Me"
"OG Kush (Super Sneak Peak)
"Where Do I Go"

===Nicole Wray===
"Stand Up"

===Max B –  Public Domain 3: Domain Pain===
"Paperwork"

===Dame Grease & Max B - Goon Music 1.5 (The Doomship)===
"Goon Music (We Run NY)" (featuring French Montana)

===LL Cool J - Exit 13===
"Ur Only a Customer"

==2009==

===Max B – Quarantine===
"Fuckfaces 2K9" (featuring Dame Grease & Mack Mustard)
"DJ Saved My Life" (featuring Mack Mustard)
"Quarantined"

===Max B - Public Domain 6: Walking the Plank===
"Dead Solver"

==2010==

===Styles P & DJ Green Lantern - The Green Ghost Project===
"That's Me" (featuring S.I.)

===Das Racist - Sit Down, Man===
"Rooftop"

===DMX - Undisputed===
"Cold World" (featuring Andreena Mill)
"I Get Scared" (featuring Rachel Taylor)
"Have You Eva"
"No Love" (featuring Andreena Mill)
"Fire" (featuring Kashmere)

==2011==

===Max B - Vigilante Season===
"Tattoos on Her Ass" 
"Money Make Me Feel Better"  	
"Where Do I Go (BBQ Music)"  	
"White Lines" (featuring Al Pac)	
"Blowin' My High"  	
"Live Comfortable"  	
"You Won't Go Far" (featuring Al Pac)	
"Fuck You"  	
"Baby I Need More"
"Lord Is Tryna Tell Ya Somthin'"
"I Need More Money"
"South Wave"
"Boss Don Season" (featuring E Snaps)

==2012==

===MGK - Lace Up===
"D3MONS" (featuring DMX)

===Riff Raff & Dame Grease - Hologram Panda===
"GOT THEM MAD"
"i CAN TELL STORiES"
"TiGER BEAR GARGOYLE"
"WHiTE SiLK PANTS"
"CAN WE CHiLL"
"GOiN' HAMiLTON"
"VERSACE LiES"

==2013==

===Papoose - The Nacirema Dream===
"Motion Picture"

===Ross Geez===
"Cali Breeze"

==2016==

===Termanology - More Politics===
"It's Quiet"

===The Lox - Filthy America... It's Beautiful===
"Hard Life" (featuring Mobb Deep)

==2017==

===Raekwon - The Wild===
"M&N" (featuring P.U.R.E)

===Masta Killa - Loyalty Is Royalty ===
"OGs Told Me" (featuring Moe Roc & Boy Backs)

===CHG Unfadable - Lifestyle ===
"Guerrilla" (featuring Vita)

==2018==
===Method Man - Meth Lab Season 2: The Lithium''
 "Grand Prix"

References

External links
 
 

Production discographies
 
Hip hop discographies
Discographies of American artists